Guido Nincheri (1885 – 1 March 1973) was a Canadian painter and designer working mainly in stained glass and fresco.

Biography
Guido Nincheri was born in Prato, Italy in 1885. He studied art in Florence and immigrated to Montreal in November 1913 after a short stay in Boston. He listed the artists Titian and Raphael as his strongest influences. He worked for Henri Perdriau, decorating churches in Quebec. He produced stained glass windows and frescoes for 100+ churches in Canada and United States.

Nincheri designed the interior decoration of many Catholic churches across Canada and New England, including Saint-Viateur d'Outremont and Saint-Léon de Westmount Church (a National Historic Site of Canada).

He not only executed frescoes and stained glass, but also designed a number of churches, including St. Anthony of Padua in Ottawa and the Church of the Madonna della Difesa in Montreal, which is famous for its fresco depicting Benito Mussolini on horseback among a group of the faithful. In the United States many of his works are found in the Franco-American Catholic Churches of the Providence Diocese in Rhode Island. Three of his largest works are in the Church of Christ the King, West Warwick, Rhode Island. His secular work includes the Roger Williams Park Museum of Natural History and Planetarium in Providence, Rhode Island and the Château Dufresne in Montreal.

St. John the Evangelist Anglican Church in Prescott, Ontario is home to Nincheri's "Lost Window", depicting the nativity and signed by the artist. Listed in their records simply as St John's Church, Prescott, curators assumed the window was in the counties of Prescott-Russell near the Quebec border but could not find it. St John the Evangelist is on the St Lawrence River west of Cornwall and south of Ottawa. From the 1930s until 2013, the three-panel scene graced the chapel attached to the church. When the chapel and adjacent hall were sold, the congregation had the window refurbished and moved into the main church worship space.

In addition to the churches mentioned above, his frescoes can be seen in Holy Ghost Church in Providence, Rhode Island; St. Ann's Church Complex in Woonsocket, Rhode Island; Ste. Amélie in Baie-Comeau, Quebec; St. Theresa of the Child Jesus in Ottawa; St. Michael's and St. Anthony's in Montreal; and the Chapel of the Saints-Noms-de-Jésus-et-de-Marie Mother House in Montreal.

Nincheri executed an estimated 5000 stained glass windows in about 200 different churches in Quebec, Ontario, the Maritimes, British Columbia, and New England, as well as at St. Stanislaus Church in Amsterdam, New York.

Recognition
Pope Pius XI dubbed Nincheri "the church's greatest artist of religious themes".

Nincheri was knighted by the Italian government in 1972.

In 1992, Nincheri was honoured for his contribution during Montreal's 350th anniversary celebrations.

One of his circa 1940 stained glass windows, entitled "Our Lady of the Rosary" from Holy Rosary Cathedral (Vancouver) was featured on a Canadian Christmas 45-cent postage stamp in 1997.

For his work at the Roger Williams Park Museum, which was donated without charge, the city of Providence named Nincheri an honorary citizen.

Works

References

Further reading
 Grondin, Mélanie (2018) The Art and Passion of Guido Nincheri, Montreal: Véhicule Press,

External links
 the art of Guido Nincheri
 Church of Christ the King, West Warwick, RI
 Stained Glass of Canada article on Nincheri
 Montreal Gazette article on studio and collection
 http://web.me.com/aboonalj/StJoesMaronite/Church_Art.html

Artists from Quebec
1885 births
1973 deaths
Canadian stained glass artists and manufacturers
Persons of National Historic Significance (Canada)
People from Prato
Italian emigrants to Canada
20th-century Canadian painters
Canadian male painters
Burials at Notre Dame des Neiges Cemetery
Catholic painters
Catholic decorative artists
20th-century Canadian male artists